Arpora village close to the North Goa beach belt.

Role in the traditional salt industry
Traditionally, it has been a coastal village, known for its traditional salt-making industry. This aspect of the village has been studied in a book, As Dear As Salt, which studies four traditional salt-making villages of Goa (including Arpora).

Night market
In recent times, it is more known for its night market, "The Saturday Night Market". This is open during the fair-weather tourist season (around September to March). Items sold range from musical mouth harps or varieties of food. It also has live musical performances.

In history
Arpora is known for St Joseph's, a school that was the first in Goa to offer education in the English language. It was set up by William Robert Lyons, a British priest who inculcated sports into the curriculum, introducing Goans to football in 1883.

References 

Villages in North Goa district